Elieser Ramos Castillo (born October 25, 1970) is a Cuban professional boxer in the heavyweight division.

Amateur career
Elieser Castillo Ramos was part of the legendary Cuban boxing program before he defected to the United States.

Defecting to the US
In 1994, Castillo escaped from Cuba on a raft with his brothers Eliseo (a fellow boxer) and Eliades and two other friends. Castillo strung together three inner tubes and at the age of 24, made his float to freedom; taking only the clothes on his back and some drinking water.
The group spent five days at sea before they drifted ashore in Panama. Soon thereafter, they were returned to Guantanamo Bay. After 18 months of processing the group was allowed to emigrate to the United States. He then moved to Miami, Florida.

Professional career
On February 20, 1996, Castillo made his professional boxing debut in Miami, Florida with a first-round TKO win over Kerry Parks. In fact, four of Castillo's first five pro opponents didn’t make it out of the opening round, and with an aggressive style and south paw power; Elieser quickly became a fan favorite in his adopted home of South Florida.

By his ninth fight, Castillo was already fighting for and winning professional titles as he demolished 85-fight veteran Bobby Crabtree in just two rounds to win the WBC Continental Americas title in 1996. A 12-round decision win over Artis Pendergrass two months later put the WBC Fecarbox title belt around his waist, and after four more victories during 1997 and 1998, Castillo appeared to be unstoppable.

On May 30, 1998, Castillo was matched up with highly regarded and unbeaten heavyweight contender Chris Byrd. In a highly anticipated clash between two of the sport's rising young stars, Byrd outpointed Castillo over ten rounds in Atlantic City. Six months later, Castillo was back in the ring and back on another winning streak, taking care of seven straight opponents over the next two years.

On October 21, 2000, Castillo earned his first title belt as a heavyweight, over hard-hitting 300-pound Paea Wolfgramm during 12 tough rounds, to win the IBO Intercontinental crown.  Castillo was considered the underdog when he took on 32-0 Andre Purlette on January 4, 2002. Castillo dismantled the unbeaten Purlette, knocking him out in five rounds.

The momentum from the win over Purlette was lost when Castillo dropped a hard-fought 12 round decision to Charles Shufford in October 2002, but eight months later, fighting at his lightest weight since 1997, Castillo bounced back like a champion, knocking out former US Olympian Lawrence Clay-Bey in nine rounds to win the NABF championship.

Castillo's next fight was dubbed: David vs- Goliath as he was pinned up against Corey Sanders, who weighed 85 pounds more than the Cuban southpaw. Castillo retained his NABF belt, beating Sanders.  Castillo later knocked out former Cruiserweight World Champion Uriah Grant in the first round.

A few months later Castillo faced a defeat during a 12 round war to DaVarryl Williamson on April 17, 2004, a bout in which Castillo sent Williamson to the canvas in round eight. A close decision loss to Kendrick Releford in October 2004 surprised boxing fans, but with a new attitude for 2005, Castillo was ready to get back into the title mix. On April 22, 2005, he faced crafty veteran Otis Tisdale.  It was a bout that looked to be competitive on paper, but once the bell rang, it was all Castillo, as he stopped his foe at the 2:43 mark of the opening round.

On October 9, 2009 after a year and six months he fought journeyman Charles Davis and was defeated by unanimous decision after six rounds.

Professional boxing record

References

External links

1970 births
Living people
Cuban male boxers
Boxers from Havana
Heavyweight boxers